Ophelia (minor planet designation: 171 Ophelia) is a large, dark Themistian asteroid that was discovered by French astronomer Alphonse Borrelly on 13 January 1877, and named after Ophelia in Shakespeare's Hamlet.

This asteroid is a member of the Themis family of asteroids that share similar orbital elements. It probably has a primitive composition, similar to that of the carbonaceous chondrite meteorites.

A 1979 study of the Algol-like light curve produced by this asteroid concluded that it was possible to model the brightness variation by assuming a binary system with a circular orbit, a period of 13.146 hours, and an inclination of 15° to the line of sight from the Earth. Photometric observations of this asteroid at the Leura Observatory in Leura, Australia during 2006 gave a rotation period of 6.6666 ± 0.0002 hours and a brightness variation of 0.50 ± 0.02 in magnitude. This is in agreement with previous studies.

Ophelia is also the name of a moon of Uranus.

References

External links 
 
 

000171
Discoveries by Alphonse Borrelly
Named minor planets
000171
000171
18770113
Things named after Shakespearean works